The 1968 Volunteer 500 was a NASCAR Grand National Series event that was held on July 21, 1968, at Bristol International Speedway in Bristol, Tennessee.

The transition to purpose-built racecars began in the early 1960s and occurred gradually over that decade.  Changes made to the sport by the late 1960s brought an end to the "strictly stock" vehicles of the 1950s.

Race report
There were 36 drivers on the racing grid as the green flag waved and the race was underway. It took three hours and sixteen minutes for David Pearson to defeat Cale Yarborough by one and a half laps in front of a live audience of twenty thousand racing fans; about the size of a small city. There were eight lead changes recorded in the NASCAR summary and 13 caution flags were waved for a grueling distance of 92 laps. Tiny Lund drove a red and silver 1967 Mercury Cyclone #16 vehicle to a respectable 13th-place finish.

Bob Burcham and Ervin Pruitt would make their respective introductions to NASCAR-style racing during this event. Richard Brickhouse ended up being the last-place finisher due to an engine malfunction on the eighth lap. Ford vehicles made up the majority of the racing grid. On lap 187, Dick Johnson would quit the reason for reasons unknown; his final race would be at the 1969 North State 200. Twelve notable crew chiefs participated in the race; including Junior Johnson, Harry Hyde, Dale Inman, Banjo Matthews, Glen Wood and Bud Moore.

Five years later, Swede Savage would be killed in a racing accident at the 1973 Indianapolis 500. The winner of this event received $5,175 in total winnings ($ when adjusted for inflation) while the last-place finisher went home with only $250 in total earnings ($ when adjusted for inflation). The total prize purse for this race was $24,140 ($ when adjusted for inflation).

Considered to be the hottest temperatures for Tennessee during the late-1960s, people were passing out all over the place.

Qualifying

Top 10 finishers

Timeline
Section reference:
 Start of race: Charlie Glotzbach had the pole position to begin the event.
 Lap 8: Richard Brickhouse managed to blow his engine while racing.
 Lap 35: James Hylton managed to blow his engine while racing.
 Lap 63: Donnie Allison managed to lose the rear end of his vehicle, he was pulled off the track for safety reasons.
 Lap 75: Pete Hamilton took over the lead from Charlie Glotzbach.
 Lap 81: Stan Meserve managed to lose the rear end of his vehicle, he was pulled off the track for safety reasons.
 Lap 86: David Pearson took over the lead from Pete Hamilton.
 Lap 114: Pete Hamilton took over the lead from David Pearson.
 Lap 117: Paul Goldsmith took over the lead from Pete Hamilton.
 Lap 120: LeeRoy Yarbrough managed to blow his engine while racing.
 Lap 135: G.C. Spencer managed to blow his engine while racing.
 Lap 143: Paul Dean Holt's vehicle had an oil leak, he was forced out of the race for safety reasons.
 Lap 176: Bob Burcham managed to blow his engine while he was racing.
 Lap 183: Cale Yarborough took over the lead from Paul Goldsmith.
 Lap 184: Paul Goldsmith took over the lead from Cale Yarborough.
 Lap 187: Dick Johnson quit the race.
 Lap 212: Bobby Allison's vehicle ran out of battery power while he was racing.
 Lap 272: David Pearson took over the lead from Paul Goldsmith.
 Lap 290: Paul Goldsmith managed to lose the rear end of his vehicle, he was pulled off the track for safety reasons.
 Lap 329: Pete Hamilton managed to blow his engine while racing.
 Lap 362: Walson Gardner managed to blow his engine while racing.
 Lap 385: Charlie Glotzbach managed to blow his engine while racing.
 Lap 387: Jabe Thomas had a terminal crash, forcing him out of the race.
 Lap 407: John Sears managed to lose the rear end of his vehicle, he was pulled off the track for safety reasons.
 Lap 465: Tiny Lund managed to blow his engine while racing.
 Lap 481: Buddy Baker managed to blow his engine while racing.
 Finish: David Pearson was officially declared the winner of the event.

References

Volunteer 500
Volunteer 500
NASCAR races at Bristol Motor Speedway